Clinton is a biographical film about former President Bill Clinton. Produced by PBS for the series of American Experience, the film documents Clinton's life, from childhood until the end of his second term in 2001. Clinton features interviews with political advisers, campaign strategists, and childhood friends. The film is narrated by Campbell Scott. It was released in 2012.

Production
The film is part of the American Experience series: "The Presidents".

Cast

James Carville
Joe Klein
Harold Ickes
John Harris
Dick Morris
Michael Waldman
Connie Chung
Carol Willis
Gail Sheehy
Robert Reich
Bernard W. Nussbaum
David Maraniss
Carolyn Staley
Joe Purvis
Nigel Hamilton
William Chafe
Paul Fray
John Brummett
Bobby Roberts
Max Brantley
Maria Crider
Ernie Dumas
Frank White
Betsey Wright
Christiane Amanpour
Kofi Annan

Music
The sound recordists of the movie are:

Len Schmitz
Bob Freeman
Tommy Alford
David Settlemoir
Roger Phenix
Doug Dunderdale
Adrienne Wade

References

External links

On the PBS - American Experience Series
Program transcript

2012 television films
2012 films
American Experience
American television films
Cultural depictions of Bill Clinton
Films about Bill Clinton
Films directed by Barak Goodman
2010s English-language films
2010s American films